Summerbreeze is a dance mix compilation produced by trance artist DJ Tiësto, released on 10 October 2000.

Track listing
 Aria - "Dido" [Armin van Buuren's Universal Religion Mix] — 7:46
 BT - "Dreaming" [Libra Mix] — 4:50
 Yahel - "Going Up" [Magikal Remake] — 6:10
 Sisko - "Light Over Me" [Gate Of Light Mix] — 6:17
 Jaimy & Kenny D - "Caught Me Running" [DJ Tiësto's Summerbreeze Remix] — 6:09
 Cabala - "Dark Blue" [Original Mix] — 5:15
 Allure - "No More Tears" [Aquilia Remix] — 4:47
 Kamaya Painters - "Far From Over" [Oliver Lieb Remix] — 5:56
 Dawnseekers - "Gothic Dream" [John Johnson Remix] — 4:35
 DJ Tiësto - "Sparkles" [Transa Remix] — 6:50
 Delerium - "Silence" [DJ Tiësto's In Search Of Sunrise Remix] — 8:42
 Major League - "Wonder?" — 6:43

References

Tiësto albums
2000 albums